Joseph Wagstaff was an American actor, musician, singer and dancer.

Early life and career
His father, Spencer George Wagstaff came from Hamilton, Ontario, Canada. He went to Detroit to work as an agent for the Grand Trunk Canadian National Railway. His father died in 1925 and his obituary lists him as leaving a widow and three sons, Earl, Sumner and Joseph. The obituary lists Joseph as a musical comedy actor.
 
In the 1930 U.S. Census Joseph Wagstaff was listed as a silent and sound film actor.

Broadway
The Passing Show of 1923 - The play ran from  until  at the Winter Garden Theater in New York.
Billie - The play ran in New York from  until . It was written, directed and produced by George M. Cohan. Wagstaff played the part of Jackson Jones. 
Wagstaff played the part of George Ellis.

Movies
Song of Kentucky -1929 Joe played the part of Jerry Reavis and performed the songs "a night of happiness","sitting by the window","rapsody" and "don't blame me." Other actors in this film were Hedda Hopper, Dorothy Burgess, Herman Bing and Bert Woodruff. There was a sound track (record) available for this film. 

Let's Go Places (1930), the working title of this was "Hollywood Nights", the name was changed along the way.  This is said to be a lost film and I do not know if any copies are still in existence.  The New York Times newspaper described this as being a singing talking film.  Other actors in this film were Betty Grable, Lola Lane, Frank Richardson and Walter Catlett.

Musical performances
Wagstaff performed with the following orchestras and performers:
 Meyer Davis Orchestra
 Paul Whiteman Orchestra
 J.W. Sutton Club Orchestra
 Lillian Roth
 Beatrice Lillie
 Medrano and Donna
 There is a reference to Joe Wagstaff and Film Land but the sources are unclear.

Later life
Joe was performing in the Detroit and Harbor Springs areas of Michigan until well into the 1990s in the summer months.

References

Musicians from Detroit
Year of birth missing
Year of death missing
20th-century American musicians